Tony America is a 1918 U.S. film directed by Thomas N. Heffron and starring Francis McDonald.

Plot 
A poor but optimistic young fruit peddler from Genoa is lured to America by his boss; once he arrives, he finds himself trapped in a stormy marriage with an unfaithful wife.

Cast 

 Francis McDonald as Tony America
 Marie Pavis as Rosa Picciano
Ray Godfrey as Mamie Dean
 Dorothy Giraci as Giulia
 Alice Davenport as Mrs. Picciano
 Harold Holland as Hans

References 

1918 films
American black-and-white films